Chester County Airport may refer to:

 Chester County G. O. Carlson Airport, Pennsylvania
 Chester Regional Airport, South Carolina